Labor induction is the process or treatment that stimulates childbirth and delivery. Inducing (starting) labor can be accomplished with pharmaceutical or non-pharmaceutical methods. In Western countries, it is estimated that one-quarter of pregnant women have their labor medically induced with drug treatment. Inductions are most often performed either with prostaglandin drug treatment alone, or with a combination of prostaglandin and intravenous oxytocin treatment.

Medical uses
Commonly accepted medical reasons for induction include:
 Postterm pregnancy, i.e. if the pregnancy has gone past the end of the 42nd week.
 Intrauterine fetal growth restriction (IUGR).
 There are health risks to the woman in continuing the pregnancy (e.g. she has pre-eclampsia).
 Premature rupture of the membranes (PROM); this is when the membranes have ruptured, but labor does not start within a specific amount of time.
 Premature termination of the pregnancy (abortion).
 Fetal death in utero and previous history of stillbirth.
 Twin pregnancy continuing beyond 38 weeks.
 Previous health conditions that puts risk on the woman and/or her child such as diabetes, high blood pressure
 High BMI

Induction of labor in those who are either at or after term improves outcomes for newborns and decreases the number of C-sections performed.

Methods of induction 
Methods of inducing labor include both pharmacological medication and mechanical or physical approaches.

Mechanical and physical approaches can include artificial rupture of membranes or membrane sweeping. Membrane sweeping may lead to more women spontaneously going into labor (and fewer women having labor induction) but it may make little difference to the risk of maternal or neonatal death, or to the number of women having c-sections or spontaneous vaginal births. 

The use of intrauterine catheters are also indicated. These work by compressing the cervix mechanically to generate release on prostaglandins in local tissues. There is no direct effect on the uterus.Results from a 2021 systematic review found no differences in cesarean delivery nor neonatal outcomes in women with low-risk pregnancies between inpatient nor outpatient cervical ripening.

Medication
 Intravaginal, endocervical or extra-amniotic administration of prostaglandin, such as dinoprostone or misoprostol. Prostaglandin E2 is the most studied compound and with most evidence behind it. A range of different dosage forms are available with a variety of routes possible. The use of misoprostol has been extensively studied but normally in small, poorly defined studies. Only a very few countries have approved misoprostol for use in induction of labor.
 Intravenous (IV) administration of synthetic oxytocin preparations is used to artificially induce labor if it is deemed medically necessary. A high dose of oxytocin does not seem to have greater benefits than a standard dose. There are risks associated with IV oxytocin induced labor. Risks include the women having induced contractions that are too vigorous, too close together (frequent), or that last too long, which may lead to added stress on the baby (changes in baby's heart rate) and may require the mother to have an emergency caesarean section. There is no high quality evidence to indicate if IV oxytocin should be stopped once a woman reaches active labor in order to reduce the incidence of women requiring caesarean sections.
 Use of mifepristone has been described but is rarely used in practice.
 
 Relaxin has been investigated, but is not currently commonly used.
 mnemonic; ARNOP: Antiprogesterone, relaxin, nitric oxide donors, oxytocin, prostaglandins

Non-pharmaceutical
 Membrane sweep, also known as membrane stripping, Hamilton maneuver, or "stretch and sweep". The procedure is carried out by a midwife or doctor as part of an internal vaginal examination. The midwife or doctor puts a couple of lubricated, gloved fingers into the women's vagina and inserts their index finger into the opening of the cervix or neck of the womb. They then use a circular movement to try to separate the membranes of the amniotic sac, containing the baby, from the cervix. This action, which releases hormones called prostaglandins, may prepare the cervix for birth and may initiate labour.
 Artificial rupture of the membranes (AROM or ARM) ("breaking the waters")
 Extra-amniotic saline infusion (EASI), in which a Foley catheter is inserted into the cervix and the distal portion expanded to dilate it and to release prostaglandins.
 Cook Medical Double Balloon known as the Cervical Ripening Balloon with Stylet for assisted placement is FDA approved. The Double balloon provides one balloon to be inflated with saline on one side of the Uterine side of the cervix and the second balloon to be inflated with saline on the vaginal side of the cervix.

When to induce 
The American Congress of Obstetricians and Gynecologists has recommended against elective induction before 39 weeks if there is no medical indication and the cervix is unfavorable. One recent study indicates that labor induction at term (41 weeks) or post-term reduces the rate of caesarean section by 12%, and also reduces fetal death.
Some observational/retrospective studies have shown that non-indicated, elective inductions before the 41st week of gestation are associated with an increased risk of requiring a caesarean section. Randomized clinical trials have not addressed this question. However, researchers have found that multiparous women who undergo labor induction without medical indicators are not predisposed to caesarean sections. Doctors and pregnant women should have a discussion of risks and benefits when considering an induction of labor in the absence of an accepted medical indication. There is insufficient evidence to determine if inducing a women's labor at home is a safe and effective approach for both the women and the baby.

Studies have shown a slight increase in risk of infant mortality for births in the 41st and particularly 42nd week of gestation, as well as a higher risk of injury to the mother and child. Due to the increasing risks of advanced gestation, induction appears to reduce the risk for caesarean delivery after 41 weeks' gestation and possibly earlier. Inducing labour after 41 weeks of completed gestion is likely to reduce the risk of perinatal death and stillbirth compared with waiting for labour to start spontaneously.

Inducing labor before 39 weeks in the absence of a medical indication (such as hypertension, IUGR, or pre-eclampsia) increases the risk of complications of prematurity including difficulties with respiration, infection, feeding, jaundice, neonatal intensive care unit admissions, and perinatal death.

Inducing labour after 34 weeks and before 37 weeks in women with hypertensive disorders (pre-eclampsia, eclampsia, pregnancy-induced hypertension) may lead to better outcomes for the woman but does not improve or worsen outcomes for the baby. More research is needed to produce more certain results. If waters break (membranes rupture) between 24 and 37 weeks' gestation, waiting for the labour to start naturally with careful monitoring of the woman and baby is more likely to lead to healthier outcomes. For women over 37 weeks pregnant whose babies are suspected of not coping well in the womb, it is not yet clear from research whether it is best to have an induction or caesarean immediately, or to wait until labour happens by itself. Similarly, there is not yet enough research to show whether it is best to deliver babies prematurely if they are not coping in the womb or whether to wait so that they are less premature when they are born.

Clinicians assess the odds of having a vaginal delivery after labor induction by a "Bishop score". However, recent research has questioned the relationship between the Bishop score and a successful induction, finding that a poor Bishop score actually may improve the chance for a vaginal delivery after induction. A Bishop Score is done to assess the progression of the cervix prior to an induction. In order to do this, the cervix must be checked to see how much it has effaced, thinned out, and how far dilated it is. The score goes by a points system depending on five factors. Each factor is scored on a scale of either 0–2 or 0–3, any total score less than 5 holds a higher risk of delivering by caesarean section.

Sometimes when a woman's waters break after 37 weeks she is induced instead of waiting for labour to start naturally. This may decrease the risks of infection for the woman and baby but more research is needed to find out whether inducing is good for women and babies longer term.

Women who have had a caesarean section for a previous pregnancy are at risk of having a uterine rupture, when their caesarean scar re-opens. Uterine rupture is very serious for the woman and the baby, and induction of labour increases this risk further. There is not yet enough research to determine which method of induction is safest for a woman who has had a caesarean section before. There is also no research to say whether it is better for these women and their babies to have an elective caesarean section instead of being induced.

Criticisms of induction 
Induced labor may be more painful for the woman as one of the side effects of intravenous oxytocin is increased contraction pains, mainly due to the rigid onset. This may lead to the increased use of analgesics and other pain-relieving pharmaceuticals. These interventions may also lead to an increased likelihood of caesarean section delivery for the baby. However, studies into this matter show differing results. One study indicated that while overall caesarean section rates from 1990 to 1997 remained at or below 20 per cent, elective induction was associated with a doubling of the rate of Caesarean section. Another study showed that elective induction in women who were not post-term increased a woman's chance of a C-section by two to three times. A more recent study indicated that induction may increase the risk of caesarean section if performed before the 40th week of gestation, but it has no effect or actually lowers the risk if performed after the 40th week.

A 2014 systematic review and meta analysis on the subject of induction and its effect on cesarean section indicate that after 41 weeks of gestation there is a reduction of cesarean deliveries when the labour is induced.

The Institute for Safe Medication Practices labeled pitocin a "high-alert medication" because of the high likelihood of "significant patient harm when it is used in error."

See also
 Tocolytic, labor suppressant

References

External links 
 
 Inducing Labor – WebMD.com
 Induction of labour. Clinical guideline, UK National Institute for Health and Clinical Excellence, June 2001.
 Josie L. Tenore: Methods for cervical ripening and induction of labor . American Family Physician, 15 May 2003.
 "Catecholamines – blood ." National Library of Medicine . N.p., n.d. Web. 28 Mar. 2011. <https://www.nlm.nih.gov/medlineplus>.

Childbirth
Obstetrical procedures
Theriogenology
Medical mnemonics